Bankole is a West African given name and surname of Yoruba origin meaning "build my house for me". Among the people named Bankole are:

Surname
 Ademola Bankole (born 1969), Nigerian football manager
 Adunni Bankole (1959–2015), Nigerian society matriarch and businesswoman
 Alani Bankole, Nigerian Egba businessman and chieftain
 Ayo Bankole (1935–1976), Nigerian composer
 Dimeji Bankole (born 1969), Nigerian politician
 Herbert Bankole-Bright (1883–1958), Sierra Leonean politician
 Isaach de Bankolé (born 1957), Ivorian actor
 Kehinde Bankole, Nigerian actress, model and television host.

Given name
 Bankole Cardoso, Nigerian businessman 
 Banky W., Nigerian musician and actor
 Bankole Timothy (1923–1994), Sierra Leonean journalist

References

Yoruba given names
Yoruba-language surnames